Callophrys irus, the frosted elfin, is a species of Lycaenidae that is native to North America.

Description 
Hindwings have one short tail. The top side of the wing is brown, males have long oval dark spots on the leading edge of their forewings. The hindwings have submarginal black spots above the tail and below the postmedian line is faint.

Life history
There is one flight period from March to April in the south and in the north it is on wing from mid-May to early June. Females will lay eggs singly on flower buds. The caterpillars eat both the flower and the developing seedpods. Chrysalids hibernate in loosely formed cocoons beneath litter below the plant. Larval foods include the pea family (Fabaceae), indigo (Baptisia tinctoria), lupine (Lupinus perennis), and rattlebox (Crotalaria sagittalis).

Range
They range from local colonies in Maine west across New York, southern Ontario, and Michigan into Wisconsin, then south along the Atlantic Coast west into Louisiana and eastern Texas. Within this range they tend to stick to open woods and scrublands.

In 2011, zoologists with the Virginia Department of Conservation and Recreation found populations of the butterfly in the city of Suffolk, Virginia, and a volunteer also found a population at Antioch Pines Natural Area Preserve.  The butterfly had not been reported in Virginia since 1994. The species is listed as threatened in Connecticut and New York.

References

 

Callophrys
Butterflies of North America
Taxa named by Jean-Baptiste Godart
Butterflies described in 1824